Jubula may refer to:

 Jubula (plant), a genus of liverwort (Marchantiophyta).
 A monotypic bird genus containing only the maned owl (Jubula lettii)
 A Functional Testing Tool for Eclipse